The Asiatic salamanders (family Hynobiidae) are primitive salamanders found all over Asia, and in European Russia. They are closely related to the giant salamanders (family Cryptobranchidae), with which they form the suborder Cryptobranchoidea. About half of hynobiids currently described are endemic to Japan.

Hynobiid salamanders practice external fertilization, or spawning. And, unlike other salamander families which reproduce internally, male hynobiids focus on egg sacs rather than females during breeding. The female lays two egg sacs at a time, each containing up to 70 eggs. Parental care is common.
 
A few species have very reduced lungs, or no lungs at all. Larvae can sometimes have reduced external gills if they live in cold and very oxygen-rich water.

Fossils of hynobiids are known from the Miocene to the present in Asia and Eastern Europe, though fossils of Cryptobranchoids more closely related to hynobiids than to giant salamanders extend back to the Middle Jurassic.

Phylogeny
Cladograms based on the work of Pyron and Wiens (2011) and modified using Mikko Haaramo

Classification
Currently, 81 species are known. These genera make up the Hynobiidae:

Subfamily Hynobiinae

 Genus Afghanodon
 Afghanodon mustersi (Smith, 1940)

 Genus Batrachuperus (Chinese stream salamanders)
 Batrachuperus karlschmidti Liu, 1950
 Batrachuperus londongensis Liu and Tian, 1978
 Batrachuperus pinchonii (David, 1872)
 Batrachuperus tibetanus Schmidt, 1925
 Batrachuperus yenyuanensis Liu, 1950

 Genus Hynobius - (Asian salamanders)
Hynobius abei Sato, 1934
Hynobius abuensis Matsui, Okawa, Nishikawa, and Tominaga, 2019
Hynobius akiensis Matsui, Okawa, and Nishikawa, 2019
Hynobius amakusaensis Nishikawa and Matsui, 2014
Hynobius amjiensis Gu, 1992
Hynobius arisanensis Maki, 1922
Hynobius bakan Matsui, Okawa, and Nishikawa, 2019
Hynobius boulengeri (Thompson, 1912)
Hynobius chinensis Günther, 1889
Hynobius dunni Tago, 1931
Hynobius formosanus Maki, 1922
Hynobius fossigenus Okamiya, Sugawara, Nagano, and Poyarkov, 2018
Hynobius fucus Lai and Lue, 2008
Hynobius glacialis Lai and Lue, 2008
Hynobius guabangshanensis Shen, 2004
Hynobius guttatus Tominaga, Matsui, Tanabe, and Nishikawa, 2019
Hynobius hidamontanus Matsui, 1987
Hynobius hirosei Lantz, 1931
Hynobius ikioi Matsui, Nishikawa, and Tominaga, 2017
Hynobius iwami Matsui, Okawa, Nishikawa, and Tominaga, 2019
Hynobius katoi Matsui, Kokuryo, Misawa, and Nishikawa, 2004
Hynobius kimurae Dunn, 1923
Hynobius kuishiensis Tominaga, Matsui, Tanabe, and Nishikawa, 2019
Hynobius leechii Boulenger, 1887
Hynobius lichenatus Boulenger, 1883
Hynobius maoershanensis Zhou, Jiang, and Jiang, 2006
Hynobius mikawaensis Matsui, Misawa, Nishikawa, and Shimada, 2017
Hynobius naevius (Temminck and Schlegel, 1838)
Hynobius nebulosus (Temminck and Schlegel, 1838)
Hynobius nigrescens Stejneger, 1907
Hynobius okiensis Sato, 1940
Hynobius osumiensis Nishikawa and Matsui, 2014
Hynobius oyamai Tominaga, Matsui, and Nishikawa, 2019
Hynobius quelpaertensis Mori, 1928
Hynobius retardatus Dunn, 1923
Hynobius sematonotos Tominaga, Matsui, and Nishikawa, 2019
Hynobius setoi Matsui, Tanabe, and Misawa, 2019
Hynobius setouchi Matsui, Okawa, Tanabe, and Misawa, 2019
Hynobius shinichisatoi Nishikawa and Matsui, 2014
Hynobius sonani (Maki, 1922)
Hynobius stejnegeri Dunn, 1923
Hynobius takedai Matsui and Miyazaki, 1984
Hynobius tokyoensis Tago, 1931
Hynobius tosashimizuensis Sugawara, Watabe, Yoshikawa, and Nagano, 2018
Hynobius tsuensis Abé, 1922
Hynobius tsurugiensis Tominaga, Matsui, Tanabe, and Nishikawa, 2019
Hynobius turkestanicus Nikolskii, 1910
Hynobius unisacculus Min, Baek, Song, Chang, and Poyarkov, 2016
Hynobius utsunomiyaorum Matsui and Okawa, 2019
Hynobius vandenburghi Dunn, 1923
Hynobius yangi Kim, Min, and Matsui, 2003
Hynobius yiwuensis Cai, 1985

 Genus Liua (Wushan salamanders)
 Liua shihi (Liu, 1950)
 Liua tsinpaensis (Liu and Hu, 1966)
 Genus Pachyhynobius (stout salamanders)
 Pachyhynobius shangchengensis Fei, Qu, and Wu, 1983
 Genus Paradactylodon (Middle Eastern stream salamanders)
 Paradactylodon persicus (Eiselt and Steiner, 1970)
 Genus Pseudohynobius
 Pseudohynobius flavomaculatus (Hu and Fei, 1978)
 Pseudohynobius guizhouensis Li, Tian, and Gu, 2010
 Pseudohynobius jinfo Wei, Xiong, and Zeng, 2009
 Pseudohynobius kuankuoshuiensis Xu and Zeng, 2007
 Pseudohynobius puxiongensis (Fei and Ye, 2000)
 Pseudohynobius shuichengensis Tian, Gu, Li, Sun, and Li, 1998
 Genus Ranodon (Semirichensk salamanders)
 Ranodon sibiricus Kessler, 1866
 Genus Salamandrella (Siberian salamanders)
Salamandrella keyserlingii Dybowski, 1870
Salamandrella tridactyla Nikolskii, 1905 

Subfamily Onychodactylinae

 Genus Onychodactylus (clawed salamanders)
 Onychodactylus fischeri (Boulenger, 1886)
 Onychodactylus fuscus Yoshikawa and Matsui, 2014
 Onychodactylus intermedius Nishikawa and Matsui, 2014
 Onychodactylus japonicus (Houttuyn, 1782)
 Onychodactylus kinneburi Yoshikawa, Matsui, Tanabe, and Okayama, 2013
 Onychodactylus koreanus Min, Poyarkov, and Vieites, 2012
 Onychodactylus nipponoborealis Kuro-o, Poyarkov, and Vieites, 2012
 Onychodactylus tsukubaensis Yoshikawa and Matsui, 2013
 Onychodactylus zhangyapingi Che, Poyarkov, and Yan, 2012
 Onychodactylus zhaoermii Che, Poyarkov, and Yan, 2012

References

External links

AmphibiaWeb:  Hynobiidae
 Tree of Life: Hynobiidae
livingunderworld.org

Cryptobranchoidea
 
Taxa named by Edward Drinker Cope